Marguerite Nicolas (4 June 1916 – 27 November 2001) was a French athlete. She competed in the women's high jump at the 1936 Summer Olympics.

References

1916 births
2001 deaths
Athletes (track and field) at the 1936 Summer Olympics
French female high jumpers
Olympic athletes of France
Place of birth missing
20th-century French women